The Brecon Beacons are a mountain range in South Wales. In a narrow sense, the name refers to the range of Old Red Sandstone peaks which lie to the south of Brecon. Sometimes referred to as 'the central Beacons' they include South Wales' highest mountain, Pen y Fan. The range forms the central section of the Brecon Beacons National Park, a designation which also encompasses ranges both to the east and the west of 'the central Beacons'. This much wider area is also commonly referred to as 'the Brecon Beacons', and it includes the Black Mountains to the east as well as the similarly named but quite distinct Black Mountain to the west. The highest peaks include Fan Brycheiniog to the west and Pen y Fan in the central part. They share the same basic geology as the central range, and so exhibit many similar features, such as the north-facing escarpment and glacial features such as lakes and cwms (cirques).

Origin of the name 
The name Bannau Brycheiniog is first attested in the sixteenth century, while Brecknock Beacons (later Brecon Beacons) first occurs in the eighteenth century.

Bannau Brycheiniog derives from the Welsh bannau (the plural of ban 'a peak')  and Brycheiniog (the name of a kingdom and later the Welsh name of the Lordship of Brecknock). The first known instance comes from the Itinerary of John Leland (1536–9) who, writing in English, refers to 'the Banne Hilles' and 'the greate hilles caullid Banne Brekeniauc'. In this he is referring specifically to Pen y Fan and the adjacent peaks. He uses 'Blak Montayne' (i.e. 'Black Mountain', corresponding to the Welsh Mynydd Du) to refer to a much wider area of high land that stretches from the Carmarthen area to within four or five miles of Monmouth. He describes this area as a single mountain made up of smaller parts with sundry names.

In its earlier usage, Brecknock Beacons also refers to a specific area around Pen y Fan, and Pen y Fan itself is sometimes called the '(Brecknock) Beacon'. In the General View of the Agriculture of the County of Brecknock (1794), John Clark of Builth (steward to Viscount Hereford) refers to 'the VANN, or Brecknock Beacon, the undisputed sovereign of all the mountains in South Wales'. On the tithe map for Cantref parish (1839), the peak of Pen y Fan is called 'Beacon'.

The Breconshire historian Theophilus Jones wrote in 1809 that 'of the lofty summits of the Brecknock Beacons, that most southwards is the lowest, and the other two nearly of a height, they are sometimes called Cader Arthur or Arthur's chair'. This implies that Brecknock Beacons referred to only three summits, of which Pen y Fan and Corn Du (the peaks known together as Cadair Arthur) were the highest.

Over time, the name Brecknock Beacons came to be used for a wider area and Brecknock (an anglicised from of Brycheiniog) was replaced by Brecon (another derivative of Brycheiniog). There is no specific evidence that the Brecon Beacons were named after the ancient practice of lighting signal fires (beacons) to warn of attacks by invaders

Geography

The Brecon Beacons range, in its narrower sense comprises six main peaks: from west to east these are: Corn Du, Pen y Fan, the highest peak, Cribyn, Fan y Bîg, Bwlch y Ddwyallt, and Waun Rydd . These summits form a long ridge, and the sections joining the first four form a horseshoe shape around the head of the Taf Fechan, which flows away to the southeast. To the northeast of the ridge, interspersed with long parallel spurs, are four cwms, four round-headed valleys or cirques; from west to east these are Cwm Sere, Cwm Cynwyn, Cwm Oergwm and Cwm Cwareli.

The round of the Taf Fechan skyline forms a ridge walk commonly known as the Beacons Horseshoe.

Geology

The majority of the mountains are formed from Old Red Sandstone which dates from the late Silurian and Devonian periods.

History
The area was inhabited during the Neolithic and the succeeding Bronze Age, the most obvious legacy of the latter being the numerous burial cairns which adorn the hills of the centre and west of the National Park. There are especially good examples of round barrows on Fan Brycheiniog, Pen y Fan and Corn Du. The former was excavated in 2002–4 and the ashes in the central cist dated to about 2000 BCE using radiocarbon dating. A wreath of meadowsweet was likely placed in the burial.

Over twenty hillforts were established in the area during the Iron Age. The largest, and indeed the largest in South Wales, were the pair of forts atop y Garn Goch near Bethlehem, Carmarthenshire – y Gaer Fawr and y Gaer Fach – literally "the big fort" and "the little fort". The forts are thought to have once been trading and political centres.

When the Romans came to Wales in 43 CE, they stationed more than 600 soldiers in the area. Y Gaer, near the town of Brecon was their main base. During the Norman Conquest many castles were erected throughout the park. One of the most famous is Carreg Cennen Castle but there are many more. Brecon Castle is of Norman origin.

There are many old tracks which were used over the centuries by drovers to take their cattle and geese to market in England. The drovers brought back gorse seed, which they sowed to provide food for their sheep.

The area played a significant role during the Industrial Revolution as various raw materials including limestone, silica sand and ironstone were quarried for transport southwards to the furnaces of the industrialising South Wales Valleys.

The Brecon Beacons National Park

The Brecon Beacons are one of four ranges of mountains and hills in South Wales which make up the Brecon Beacons National Park. The National Park was established in 1957, the third of the three Welsh parks after Snowdonia in 1951 and the Pembrokeshire Coast National Park in 1952.

Mountain rescue

Mountain rescue in south Wales is provided by five volunteer groups, with the police having overall command. In serious situations they are aided by RAF helicopters from RAF Chivenor or RAF Valley. The five groups are:
 CBMRT – Central Beacons Mountain Rescue Team
 BMRT – Brecon Mountain Rescue Team 
 LMRT – Longtown Mountain Rescue Team based in the east 
 WBMSART – Western Beacons Mountain Search and Rescue Team 
 SARDA South Wales – Search and Rescue Dog Association covering South and Mid Wales

The groups are funded primarily by donations. Their work is not restricted to mountain rescue – they frequently assist the police in their search for missing or vulnerable people in the community.

Military training

The Brecon Beacons are used for training members of the UK armed forces and military reservists. The Army’s Infantry Battle School is located at Brecon, and the Special Air Service (SAS) use the area to test the fitness of applicants. In July 2013 three soldiers died from overheating or heatstroke on an SAS selection exercise. An army captain had been found dead on Corn Du earlier in the year after training in freezing weather for the SAS.

See also

 Brecon Mountain Railway
Brecon Beacons Food Festival

References

External links

 Tourist Information Brecon Beacons Park, Official Brecon Beacons Tourism Association

 
Landforms of Merthyr Tydfil County Borough
Landforms of Powys
Mountain ranges of Wales
Mountain ranges of the Brecon Beacons National Park
de:Brecon-Beacons-Nationalpark
Dark sky preserves in Wales